Kenneth Richard Murray (born January 22, 1948) is a Canadian former professional ice hockey defenceman who played 106 games in the National Hockey League for the Kansas City Scouts, Toronto Maple Leafs, New York Islanders and Detroit Red Wings between 1970 and 1975. The rest of his career, which lasted from 1968 to 1979, was spent in the minor leagues, mainly the American Hockey League.

Career statistics

Regular season and playoffs

External links
 

1948 births
Living people
Baltimore Clippers players
Canadian expatriate ice hockey players in the United States
Canadian ice hockey defencemen
Cincinnati Swords players
Detroit Red Wings players
Kansas City Scouts players
New Haven Nighthawks players
New York Islanders players
Philadelphia Firebirds (AHL) players
Rhode Island Reds players
Seattle Totems (WHL) players
Springfield Indians players
Ice hockey people from Toronto
Toronto Maple Leafs players
Tulsa Oilers (1964–1984) players
Undrafted National Hockey League players
Virginia Wings players